Iron stress repressed RNA (IsrR) is a cis-encoded antisense RNA which regulates the expression of the photosynthetic protein isiA. IsiA expression is activated by the Ferric uptake regulator protein (Fur) under iron stress conditions. IsiA enhances photosynthesis by forming a ring around photosystem I which acts as an additional antenna complex.

IsrR is abundant when there is a sufficient iron concentration. IsrR is encoded for within the opposite stand of isiA gene and contains a conserved stem loop secondary structure. Under sufficient iron conditions IsrR binds to its complementary region which corresponds to the central third of the isiA mRNA. The resulting duplex RNA is then targeted for degradation. This allows the antisense RNA to act as a reversible switch that responds to changes in environmental conditions to modulate the expression of the isiA protein.

IsrR was originally identified within cyanobacteria but may be conserved throughout a number of photosynthetic species from multiple kingdoms. At present, IsrR is the only non coding RNA identified that has a regulatory role on photosynthetic proteins.

References

External links
Rfam entry for antisense RNA which regulates isiA expression

Biochemistry